Kerrieae is a tribe of the rose family, Rosaceae, belonging to the subfamily Amygdaloideae.

Kerrieae genera include 
Coleogyne Torr.
Kerria DC.
Neviusia A. Gray
Rhodotypos Siebold & Zucc.

References

External links 

 
Rosales tribes